Cyber City or Cybercity may refer to:

 Cyber City, Gurgaon, an industrial park in Gurgaon, India
 Cyber City, Kochi, a proposed Special Economic Zone information technology park adjacent to Kochi, India
 Cyber City, Magarpatta a privately owned gated community in the Hadapsar–area of Pune, India
 Ebene CyberCity, a city on the island nation of Mauritius
 Cybercity 1, a planned city and part of the Multimedia Super Corridor project in Malaysia
 Cyber City Oedo 808, a 1990–91 cyberpunk original video animation
Yadanabon Cyber City, the largest information technology center in Myanmar
 Cyber City, a fictional city in the role-playing game Deltarune: Chapter 2

See also 

 Smart city
 CyberTown, a defunct online community
 Cyber (disambiguation)
 City (disambiguation)